Monghsu or Maingshu was a Shan state in what is today Burma. It belonged to the Eastern Division of the Southern Shan States. The main river in the area was the Nam Pang.

History
Monghsu became independent from Hsenwi in 1857 under a personal union with the neighbouring state of Mongsang. It was a tributary of Burma until 1887, when the Shan states submitted to British rule after the fall of the Konbaung dynasty. The residence of the Myoza was at Mong Hsu.

Rulers
The rulers of Monghsu/Möngsang bore the title of Myoza, "duke" or chief of town.

Myozas
1857 - 1879                Hkun Mon
1879 - 1901                Hkun Maha 
1901 - 1917                Hkun Kyaw                          (b. 1845 - d. 1917)
1917 - 19..                Hkun Sao (Hkun Saw)                (b. 1845 - d. 19..)

References

External links
"Gazetteer of Upper Burma and the Shan states"
The Imperial Gazetteer of India

Shan States
1857 establishments in Asia
Former states of Myanmar